Raymond Patrick Duggan (1913 – 20 January 1950) was an Australian speedway rider. He first rode in the United Kingdom with the New Cross Lambs. Duggan represented the Australia many times at test level and was the younger brother of five times Australian champion Vic Duggan.

Career summary
He started his career in 1938 with the New Cross Rangers. In 1947 he returned to the UK with the Harringay Racers.

Ray Duggan never became Australian National Champion with his best finish being third on three occasions in 1947, 1948 and 1949. The 1947 event was behind his brother Vic Duggan and Lionel Van Praag, the inaugural World Champion.

Death
On 20 January 1950, Duggan was killed at the Sydney Sports Ground after being involved in a high-speed crash with friend Norman Clay. Clay also died from his injuries.

References

1913 births
1950 deaths
Australian speedway riders
People from New South Wales
Harringay Racers riders
New Cross Rangers riders
Motorcycle racers who died while racing
Sport deaths in Australia
Accidental deaths in New South Wales
Date of birth unknown